Baklanova Muraviika is a village in Ukraine, in Chernihiv Raion, Chernihiv Oblast. The population is 473 persons in 2014; in the early 2000s 645 persons lived in the village.

History 
In 2007 village school was closed and pupils were transferred in a school in Gorbove.

Until 18 July 2020, Baklanova Muraviika belonged to Kulykivka Raion. The raion was abolished in July 2020 as part of the administrative reform of Ukraine, which reduced the number of raions of Chernihiv Oblast to five. The area of Kulykivka Raion was merged into Chernihiv Raion.

Famous people 
 Vadim Skuratovsky (Vadym Leontiyovych Skurativskiy) is a Ukrainian art historian and critic, an expert in literature, philologist, and political essayist.

Gallery

References

Посилання 

 Село Бакланова Муравейка, Черниговскаго уѣзда. — Черниговъ: Типографія Губернскаго Правленія, 1904. — 29 с.
 Черниговские епархиальные известия. Отдел официальный, неофициальный. № 24 (15 декабря 1911 г.) — с. 721—723.

Villages in Chernihiv Raion